Khalapur is a town and tehsil in Raigad district, Maharashtra state of India.

References

External links
 

Cities and towns in Raigad district
Talukas in Maharashtra